Myra Vale is a small village in the Southern Highlands of New South Wales, Australia, in Wingecarribee Shire.

The population is about 500 including the villages of Avoca and Fitzroy Falls.

Towns of the Southern Highlands (New South Wales)
Wingecarribee Shire